Roberto Carruthers is an Argentine tennis coach and former professional player.

Known as "Kiko", Carruthers competed during the 1970s and 1980s, most successfully as a doubles player. He won two doubles titles on the ATP Challenger Tour and featured in the main draws at both the French Open and Wimbledon.

Carruthers was the first coach of Gastón Gaudio, who he took under his guidance at the Temperley Lawn Tennis club when the future French Open champion was 12 years of age. He also coached Guillermo Pérez Roldán on tour.

ATP Challenger titles

Doubles: (2)

References

External links
 
 

Year of birth missing (living people)
Living people
Argentine male tennis players
Argentine tennis coaches